Poser is a 2021 American drama film directed by Noah Dixon and Ori Segev and starring Sylvie Mix and Bobbi Kitten.

Cast
Sylvie Mix as Lennon Gates
Bobbi Kitten as Herself

Release
The film premiered at the Tribeca Film Festival on June 9, 2021.  In September 2021, it was announced that Oscilloscope acquired North American distribution rights to the film.

The film was released theatrically in Columbus, Ohio on June 3, 2022 and in New York City and Los Angeles on June 17, 2022.

Reception

Box office
In the United States and Canada, the film earned an estimated $15,250 from one theater in its opening weekend.

Critical response
The film has a 92 percent rating on Rotten Tomatoes based on 25 reviews.

Kate Erbland of IndieWire graded the film a B and described it as "Spiky, funny, feverish, and more than a little nail-biting..." Tomris Laffly of Variety gave the film a positive review, writing that "the whole thing is oddly beautiful, absurdly compelling and even freakishly watchable."

References

External links
 
 

2021 directorial debut films
2021 drama films
American drama films
2020s English-language films
2020s American films